José Corona Núñez (July 4, 1906 – January 6, 2002) was a Mexican author, anthropologist, and history professor who discovered several important archeological sites throughout México.  His main body of work revolved around his native state of Michoacán, and in particular the Tarascan or Purépecha culture.

Early life 
José Corona Núñez was born in Cuitzeo del Porvenir on July 4, 1906.  His father was Marcelino Corona García and his mother was María del Pilar Núñez Berrospe.  From an early age he attended the Agustino Convent of Cuitzeo and helped with the various common rituals.

Education and religious studies 
Through his involvement with the convent Corona Núñez decided to pursuit priesthood.  He would later clarify that his primary motivation was to continue to learn and given his family's limited resources private schooling was not an option.  In January 1920 he began his seminary studies in the San Pablo Convent of Yuriria, Guanajuato.  There he studied Latin, Greek, French, Grammar, Religion, and Mexican history, amongst other topics.  He then moved to another convent in San Luis Potosí to continue his studies as a hermit and continue his studies.  On October 2, 1923, at the age of 17, he became Friar Angel in the Order of Saint Augustine.  However, the following year he resigned by mailing a letter to the Prior General in Rome asking for his removal.  The last religious ceremony in which he participated took place in his native convent of Cuitzeo in which he was disrobed and he removed all emblems (belt, cross, etc.) and signed a document addressed to the Vatican declaring the acknowledgement of his request, on April 5, 1926.

Career 
Corona Núñez received a scholarship to attend the National School of Anthropology and History ("Escuela Nacional de Antropología e Historia").  As a student he worked with Donald D. Brand in his work "Quiroga, A Mexican Municipio".  After his studies he became a rural teacher and eventually director of various primary schools throughout Michoacan.  He later became Director of the Anthropology Department of the State of Nayarit, founded the Anthropology Museums of Tepic and Colima, and was in charge of the Anthropology Department of the University of Michoacan.

As an anthropologist José Corona Núnez discovered the circular pyramid of the Ixtlán del Rio archeological site.

Bibliography 
José Corona Núnez created more than 100 articles and published more than a dozen books  throughout the 20th century.  Some of the more well known are:
 Mitologia Tarasca (1957, Fondo de Cultura Económica)
 Historia de los Antiguos Habitantes de Michoacán (1988, Balsar Editores SA de CV.)
 Voces del Pasado (1995, Centro de Estudios Cultura Nicolaita )
 Diccionario Geográfico Tarasco-Náhuatl (1993, UMSNH) 
 Curácuaro de Morelos (1991, Centro de Estudios Cultura Nicolaita)

References

1906 births
2002 deaths
Mexican anthropologists
20th-century Mexican historians
Mexican male writers
National School of Anthropology and History alumni
People from Michoacán
Academic staff of Universidad Michoacana de San Nicolás de Hidalgo
20th-century anthropologists